The Gobionellinae are a subfamily of fish which was formerly classified in the family Gobiidae, the gobies, but the 5th Edition of Fishes of the World classifies the subfamily as part of the family Oxudercidae. Members of Gobionellinae mostly inhabit estuarine and freshwater habitats; the main exception is the genus Gnatholepis, which live with corals in marine environments. The subfamily is distributed in tropical and temperate regions around the world with the exception of the northeastern Atlantic Ocean, the Mediterranean Sea, and the Ponto-Caspian region. It includes around 370 species and 55 genera: Wikipedia articles about genera list about 389 species.

Genera

 Acanthogobius Gill, 1869
 Amblychaeturichthys Bleeker, 1874
 Astrabe Jordan & Snyder, 1901
 Awaous Valenciennes, 1837
 Brachygobius Bleeker, 1874
 Caecogobius Berti & Ercolini 1991
 Chaenogobius Gill, 1859
 Chaeturichthys Richardson, 1844
 Chlamydogobius Whitley, 1930
 Clariger Jordan & Snyder, 1901
 Clevelandia Eigenmann & Eigenmann, 1888
 Ctenogobius Gill, 1858
 Eucyclogobius Gill, 1862
 Eugnathogobius H.M. Smith, 1931
 Eutaeniichthys Jordan & Snyder, 1901
 Evorthodus Gill, 1859
 Gillichthys Cooper, 1864
 Gnatholepis Bleeker, 1874
 Gobioides Lacepède, 1800
 Gobionellus Girard, 1858
 Gobiopterus Bleeker, 1874
 Gymnogobius Gill, 1863
 Hemigobius Bleeker, 1874
 Ilypnus Jordan & Evermann, 1896
 Lepidogobius Gill, 1859
 Lethops Hubbs, 1926
 Leucopsarion Hilgendorf, 1880
 Luciogobius Gill, 1859
 Mistichthys H.M. Smith, 1902
 Mugilogobius Smitt, 1900
 Oligolepis Bleeker, 1874
 Oxyurichthys Bleeker, 1857
 Paedogobius Iwata, S. Hosoya & Larson, 2001
 Pandaka Herre, 1927
 Papuligobius I. S. Chen & Kottelat, 2003
 Parawaous Watson, 1993
 Pseudogobiopsis Bleeker, 1875
 Pseudogobius Popta, 1922
 Pseudorhinogobius(J. S. Zhong & H. L. Wu, 1998)
 Pterogobius Gill, 1863
 Quietula Jordan & Evermann, 1895
 Redigobius Herre, 1927
 Rhinogobius Gill, 1859
 Sagamia Jordan & Snyder, 1901
 Schismatogobius de Beaufort, 1912
 Stenogobius Bleeker, 1874
 Stigmatogobius Bleeker, 1874
 Suruga Jordan & Snyder, 1901
 Synechogobius Gill, 1863
 Tamanka Herre, 1927
 Tridentiger Gill, 1859
 Typhlogobius Steindachner, 1879

References

External links 

Gobioid Research Institute

 
Oxudercidae
Taxa named by Pieter Bleeker